Brad Pollitt is an American politician. He is a Republican representing the 52nd district in the Missouri House of Representatives.

Political career 

In 2018, former District 52 representative Nathan Beard announced that he would not seek reelection. Pollitt ran for the open seat and defeated Democrat Dan Marshall to win. He is running for reelection in 2020.

As of June 2020, Pollitt sits on the following committees:
 Agriculture Policy
 Health and Mental Health Policy
 Special Committee on Student Accountability

Electoral History 
 Brad Pollitt has not yet had any opponents in Republican primary elections, thus getting nominated each time by default.

Personal life 

Pollitt holds a bachelor's degree from Northeast Missouri State University and a master's degree from William Woods University, as well as an educational specialist certificate from the University of Central Missouri. He and his wife, Danette, have three children and live in Sedalia, Missouri.

References 

Year of birth missing (living people)
Living people
Republican Party members of the Missouri House of Representatives
21st-century American politicians